Butembe is one of the six traditional chiefdoms of the kingdom of Busoga in Uganda.

It became a part of the British protectorate in Busoga in 1896. Its ruler is known as the Ntembe.

References

History of Uganda